El Maader El Kabir is a small town and rural commune in Tiznit Province of the Souss-Massa-Drâa region of Morocco. At the time of the 2004 census, the commune had a total population of 7,918 people living in 1,595 households.

References

Rural communes of Souss-Massa
Populated places in Tiznit Province